The Grand Prix Ayuntamiento de Ispaster is a cyclo-cross race held in Ispaster, Spain.

Past winners

References
 Results

Cycle races in the Basque Country
Cyclo-cross races
Recurring sporting events established in 1997
1997 establishments in Spain
Sport in Biscay